Notonomus is a genus of beetles in the family Carabidae, containing the following species:

 Notonomus aequabilis Moore, 1960
 Notonomus aequalis Sloane, 1907
 Notonomus aeques (Castelnau, 1867)
 Notonomus amabilis (Castelnau, 1867)
 Notonomus angulosus Sloane, 1913
 Notonomus angustibasis Sloane, 1902
 Notonomus apicalis (Sloane, 1913)
 Notonomus arthuri Sloane, 1890
 Notonomus atrodermis Sloane, 1903
 Notonomus auricollis (Castelnau, 1867)
 Notonomus australasiae (Dejean, 1828)
 Notonomus australis (Castelnau, 1840)
 Notonomus bakewelli Sloane, 1902
 Notonomus banksi Sloane, 1910
 Notonomus besti Sloane, 1902
 Notonomus bodeae Sloane, 1913
 Notonomus carteri Sloane, 1907
 Notonomus chalybaeus (Dejean, 1828)
 Notonomus colossus Sloane, 1902
 Notonomus crenulatus Sloane, 1911
 Notonomus croesus (Castelnau, 1867)
 Notonomus cupricolor Sloane, 1903
 Notonomus curvicollis Sloane, 1923
 Notonomus cylindricus Sloane, 1913
 Notonomus darlingii (Castelnau, 1867)
 Notonomus dehiscens Sloane, 1923
 Notonomus depressipennis (Chaudoir, 1874)
 Notonomus dimorphicus Darlington, 1961
 Notonomus dives Sloane, 1915
 Notonomus doddi Sloane, 1913
 Notonomus dyscoloides (Motschulsky, 1865)
 Notonomus ellioti Darlington, 1961
 Notonomus ellipticus Sloane, 1923
 Notonomus excisipennis Sloane, 1902
 Notonomus fergusoni Sloane, 1910
 Notonomus flos Darlington, 1961
 Notonomus froggatti Sloane, 1902
 Notonomus frontevirens Sloane, 1916
 Notonomus gippsiensis (Castelnau, 1867)
 Notonomus gravis (Chaudoir, 1865)
 Notonomus hedleyi Sloane, 1916
 Notonomus hopsoni Sloane, 1923
 Notonomus ingratus (Chaudoir, 1865)
 Notonomus johnstoni Sloane, 1907
 Notonomus kershawi Sloane, 1902
 Notonomus kingi (W.S. Macleay, 1826)
 Notonomus kosciuskianus Sloane, 1902
 Notonomus lateralis Sloane, 1890
 Notonomus leai Sloane, 1902
 Notonomus lesueurii (Castelnau, 1867)
 Notonomus longus Sloane, 1913
 Notonomus macoyi Sloane, 1902
 Notonomus marginatus (Castelnau, 1840)
 Notonomus masculinus Darlington, 1953
 Notonomus mediosulcatus (Chaudoir, 1865)
 Notonomus melas Sloane, 1903
 Notonomus metallicus Sloane, 1913
 Notonomus miles (Castelnau, 1867)
 Notonomus minimus Sloane, 1907
 Notonomus molestus (Chaudoir, 1865)
 Notonomus montellus Darlington, 1961
 Notonomus montorum Darlington, 1961
 Notonomus muelleri Sloane, 1902
 Notonomus nitescens Sloane, 1911
 Notonomus nitidicollis (Chaudoir, 1865)
 Notonomus obscurus Moore, 1963
 Notonomus opacicollis (Chaudoir, 1865)
 Notonomus opulentus Castelnau, 1867
 Notonomus peronii (Castelnau, 1867a)
 Notonomus philippi (Newman, 1842)
 Notonomus phillipsii (Castelnau, 1867)
 Notonomus planipectus Sloane, 1903
 Notonomus pluripunctatus Sloane, 1903
 Notonomus politulus (Chaudoir, 1865)
 Notonomus polli Sloane, 1913
 Notonomus prominens Sloane, 1913
 Notonomus queenslandicus Sloane, 1902
 Notonomus rainbowi Sloane, 1902
 Notonomus resplendens (Castelnau, 1867)
 Notonomus saepistriatus Sloane, 1907
 Notonomus satrapa (Castelnau, 1867)
 Notonomus scotti Sloane, 1907
 Notonomus semiplicatus (Castelnau, 1840)
 Notonomus spenceri Sloane, 1902
 Notonomus sphodroides (Dejean, 1828)
 Notonomus spurgeoni Darlington, 1953
 Notonomus striatocollis (Castelnau, 1867)
 Notonomus strzeleckianus Sloane, 1902
 Notonomus subiridescens (Chaudoir, 1865)
 Notonomus taylori Sloane, 1903
 Notonomus tenuistriatus Sloane, 1913
 Notonomus tessellatus Sloane, 1913
 Notonomus tillyardi Sloane, 1913
 Notonomus transitus Darlington, 1961
 Notonomus triplogenioides (Chaudoir, 1865)
 Notonomus truncatus Sloane, 1916
 Notonomus tubericauda Bates, 1878
 Notonomus variicollis (Chaudoir, 1865)
 Notonomus victoriensis Sloane, 1902
 Notonomus violaceus (Castelnau, 1834)
 Notonomus wentworthi Sloane, 1913
 Notonomus wilcoxii Castelnau, 1867

References

 
Pterostichinae